Palakkad Junction (formerly known as Olavakkode Junction, station code: PGT) is one of the largest railway station in Kerala state, India situated in the city of Palakkad and the second largest railway station in the district. Palakkad Junction is the cleanest railway station in the state of Kerala as per the survey conducted by Indian Railway Catering & Tourism Corporation. It also boasts one of the longest railway platforms in Kerala. Palakkad Junction serves as the major railway hub for the city of Palakkad in Kerala while the secondary hub, Palakkad Town railway station which is situated in the heart.

Location

Olavakkode is a suburb of Palakkad city and is located on NH 966 which connects Palakkad to Kozhikode. The station falls in the Palakkad railway division. It is one of the important railway stations of Southern Railway zone of the Indian Railways.

Lines
Palakkad Junction is located on Jolarpettai–Shoranur line and is the terminating point for the Palakkad–Madurai rail line. The other station serving the city is Palakkad Town railway station.

Infrastructure

The station is served by five platforms. Platforms 1, 2 and 3 are used for trains going towards  Palakkad Town, Shoranur, Thrissur and where as platforms 4 and 5 are mainly used for trains going towards Chennai. The electronic interlocking system, which will replace the prevailing route relay interlocking system, was also completed. The train traffic in the junction will be considerably high once the trains from Pollachi Junction enter here. More trains are expected to commence and terminate from Palakkad once the pit line in Palakkad town station is installed.

MEMU Shed
A Mainline Electric Multiple Unit MEMU shed operates to maintain the suburban trains running between Shornur and Erode.

References

External links

Railway stations in Palakkad district
Railway junction stations in Kerala
Palakkad railway division
Transport in Palakkad